Lake Superior  is the largest of the North America Great Lakes.

Lake Superior may also refer to:
 Superior Lake (California), a dry lake basin
 Lake Superior State Park, in New York
 Lac-Supérieur, Quebec, a municipality
 Sudbury – White River train, formerly the Lake Superior
 Lake Superior and Mississippi Railroad